Angry Birds Reloaded is a 2021 casual puzzle video game developed by Finnish video game developer Rovio Entertainment and the 19th game in the Angry Birds series of mobile games. The game was released exclusively for the Apple Arcade subscription service on June 15th, 2021. It is inspired by the classic Angry Birds slingshot games, with new graphics as well as characters and settings from the Angry Birds films.

Plot

Red catches three Minion Pigs spying on him while showing the different Pig City locations with Bomb, Chuck and the Blues. The pigs run off, but the birds chase them back, and proceed to destroy their fortresses with the aid of the slingshot.

Some time after, Red, Chuck, Bomb and the Blues climb up Eagle Mountain to find Mighty Eagle urinating in the infamous Lake of Wisdom, in which two Minion Pigs and Garry are found swimming and relaxing. The birds then demolish the pig fortresses found in the area.

On Terence and Matilda's wedding day, all seems to go smoothly until Leonard, Chef Pig and a Minion Pig break out of the wedding cake. The birds once again destroy the pigs' structures that were built in the area.

Afterwards, the pigs steal the eggs once more. This journey takes them to Piggy Island, where they find the pigs in South Beach reclaim the eggs in the Cobalt Plateaus.

While on Piggy Island, Red, Chuck and Bomb spy on Pig City on a tree branch, which Leonard saws off. The birds then destroy the structures found in the city, and make it to the Pig Palace. There, they find the eggs and reencounter Leonard and Chef Pig, who trap the birds in a cage. However, the eggs the pigs stole are fakes that explode when put into the cauldron, freeing the birds and defeating the pigs.

Some time later, a giant ice ball mysteriously appears on the coast. Red, Chuck, Bomb, Silver, Leonard, Garry and Courtney all come to the scene to investigate. Upon learning that ice balls come from a mysterious third island, Eagle Island, the birds and pigs decide to form a temporary alliance to save their homelands. The team make it to Eagle Island and separate into two groups: Red and Silver go on their own and spy on the eagle guards while the others use the Harvey suit to sneak into the ice cannon launching the ice balls. Upon making it inside the ice cannon, the group reunite and meets Zeta, the leader of the eagles. Despite the team's efforts to take down the rest of the eagle army, Zeta and some eagle guards still end up capturing them. However, the ice cannon conveniently ends up exploding, freeing the birds and pigs and defeating the eagles.

Gameplay
The gameplay of Angry Birds Reloaded is very similar to the original games on which it is based. The player aims and launches birds from a slingshot at pig fortresses until all pigs in the level have been destroyed. This must be achieved before the player runs out of birds to fire. However, unlike previous installations in the series, Angry Birds Reloaded includes an Eagle Island setting, where pigs are introduced as playable characters that can be fired from the slingshot, and eagles appear as enemies. Each playable bird/pig has a ability that is activated when tapping the screen as they are mid-flight. Every bird's abilities return from the previous games such as the original Angry Birds and its 2015 sequel (in Silver's case). However, Leonard has the same ability as Terence and Harvey/Courtney has the same ability as Matilda.

The game is divided into levels, which are subdivided into episodes. Initially, the game included seven episodes. Although the game includes power-ups, unlike in previous games, the game's release as part of mobile gaming subscription service Apple Arcade means that these power-ups are purchased with coins won in-game instead of with real-world money.

References

  Text was copied from Angry Birds Reloaded at the Angry Birds Wiki, which is licensed under the Creative Commons Attribution-ShareAlike 3.0 Unported (CC BY-SA 3.0)

2021 video games
Angry Birds video games
Mobile games
Casual games
Video games about birds
Fictional birds
IOS games
Puzzle video games
Video games developed in Finland
Rovio Entertainment games
Single-player video games